The River class is a type of bulk carrier designed for service on the Great Lakes. The MV Mark W. Barker first of the class is due to entered service for the Interlake Steamship Company on 27 July 2022.

History
In April 2019, it was announced that Interlake had ordered a single River-class ship from Fincantieri Bay Shipbuilding of Sturgeon Bay, Wisconsin.  The vessel was the first new ship ordered by Interlake since 1981, and the first Great Lakes bulker built on the Great Lakes since 1983.  Construction began in August 2019, when the first steel was cut.  The ship was built in modular sections, the first of which were joined together at a ceremonial keel laying in June 2020. At the event, Interlake announced that she would be named MV Mark W. Barker, the ship was commissioned on 1 September 2022

Design
It has a deadweight tonnage of 28,000 DWT, with a unique cargo hold and hatch design that allows for the transport of both bulk raw materials and large individual cargo.

References

Great Lakes freighters
Ships built in Wisconsin
Ship classes